Eugene Bransford Ferguson (born June 5, 1947) is a retired American football player in the National Football League.  Ferguson played offensive tackle for the San Diego Chargers and the Houston Oilers. He replaced Pro Football Hall of Fame tackle Ron Mix while with the Chargers.

He was one of the first NFL players to weigh 300 pounds. In 1970, he was listed as the only 300-pounder. That number has exploded to 358 as of 2013.

References

External links

1947 births
Politicians from Lynchburg, Virginia
American football offensive tackles
Norfolk State Spartans football players
Houston Oilers players
San Diego Chargers players
Living people